Konung: Legend of the North is a role-playing video game (CRPG) developed by 1C and released in 2000 by Strategy First.  The game takes place in the 7th century in Scandinavia, a world full of legends and myths. The main character looks for three pieces of an amulet to open a gate that leads to a mighty dragon, who defends the "Bracelet of Dominion". The game has 2 sequels, Konung 2: Blood of Titans. and Konung III: Ties of the Dynasty.

Konung 2

Konung 2: Blood of Titans is a role-playing video game developed by 1C, released in 2004. It is the sequel to the 2000 PC game, Konung: Legends of the North.

Our hero who helped to defeat the forces of darkness now is cursed by a demonic artifact - bracelet called Sovereign. The recent hero turned into a dark master and threatens the land he saved. As legend says, only six descendants of the Titans can face it.

Konung 3

Konung III: Ties of the Dynasty is a 2010 video game set in the early Middle Ages. It combines elements of RPG and strategy games. Konung III is the third game in the Konung series.

Konung III features a game world based on Scandinavian, Slavic and Byzantine mythology. The player visits different villages and meets different characters over the course of the game; certain NPCs can be hired to assist the player in battle. The game will allow the use of both melee and ranged weapons.

References

External links
 Official Konung site
 Official Konung 2 site
 Official Konung 3 site
 
 

1C Company games
Real-time strategy video games
Fantasy video games
Role-playing video games
Video games developed in Russia
Windows games
Windows-only games
2000 video games
2004 video games
2010 video games
Strategy First games
Got Game Entertainment games